The 1958 Kilkenny Senior Hurling Championship was the 64th staging of the Kilkenny Senior Hurling Championship since its establishment by the Kilkenny County Board.

On 2 November 1958, Tullaroan won the championship after a 1–12 to 3–02 defeat of Bennettsbridge in the final. It was their 19th championship title overall and their first title in ten championship seasons.

Results

Final

References

Kilkenny Senior Hurling Championship
Kilkenny Senior Hurling Championship